Pingo Doce (Sweet Drop in English) is one of the largest supermarket operators in Portugal, with almost 400 stores (Continente is the largest food retailer, operating over 550 stores, while Minipreço has more than 500). It belongs to the Portuguese company Jerónimo Martins and the Dutch-based Ahold Delhaize. Since 1992, Pingo Doce has been operated as a joint venture by Jerónimo Martins, in which it holds 51% and the Dutch retail chain Ahold Delhaize 49%. In the 1990s, Jerónimo Martins acquired Brazilian supermarket chain Sé Supermercados, which became the Brazilian equivalent to Pingo Doce. In Poland, since 1997 the group has established Biedronka, the country's largest food retail chain. In the early 2000s, Companhia Brasileira de Distribuição / Grupo Pão de Açúcar, bought out Sé, rebranding its stores as Pão de Açúcar and CompreBem.

Since 2008, the chain uses its current logo, repositioned itself in the market, merged the Feira Nova supermarkets and hypermarkets into the Pingo Doce brand and has done aggressive marketing and advertising campaigns in order to maintain its position. The Jerónimo Martins Group began establishing local businesses in Colombia in March 2013 through Ara. From 2008 to 2010, Pingo Doce took over the Feira Nova brand. In 2021, Pingo Doce popularized the slogan "Quem trouxe, quem trouxe? Foi o Pingo Doce!" (Who brought [it]? Who brought [it]? It was Sweet Drop!) with a catchy Christmas jingle.

See also
 2012 Rush to Pingo Doce
 Recheio
 Jerónimo Martins

References

https://www.nit.pt/cultura/quem-trouxe-quem-trouxe-a-historia-da-criacao-da-musica-sensacao-do-pingo-doce

Ahold Delhaize
Supermarkets of Portugal
Companies of Portugal
Department stores of Portugal
Distribution companies of Portugal
Retail companies of Portugal
Companies established in 1980
Supermarkets of Spain
Retail companies of Spain
Food retailers
1980 establishments
Supermarkets
Distribution (marketing)